Seegmiller is a surname. Notable people with the surname include:

J. Edwin Seegmiller (1920–2006), American physician
Jay Seegmiller (politician) (born 1958), American politician
Lisa Hopkins Seegmiller (born 1978), American classical singer and actress
Wilhelmina Seegmiller (1866–1913), Canadian-born American author, illustrator, art teacher